"Papa t'es plus dans l'coup" (English translation: "Daddy, you are not 'with it' anymore") is a song by French singer Sheila. Released on the same EP with "L'école est finie", the song also became a huge hit.  Sheila performed it many times on television. Also, a Scopitone (an early form of music video) was made for it.

Lyrics 
The song reflects on parents' misunderstanding of their children, on the generational conflict.

Writing 
The song was written by Jill & Jan and produced by Jacques Plait and Claude Carrère.

Covers 
Ludivine Sagnier sang this song in François Ozon's 2002 movie 8 Women.

See also
Generation gap
1960s in France

References

External links 
 

Sheila (singer) songs
1963 songs
1963 singles